Amy Eilberg (born October 12, 1954) is the first female rabbi ordained in Conservative Judaism. She was ordained in 1985 by the Jewish Theological Seminary of America, one of the academic centers and spiritual centers of Conservative Judaism.

Youth and early life
Eilberg was born October 12, 1954, in Philadelphia, USA. Her father, Joshua Eilberg, represented Pennsylvania in the U.S. House of Representatives, and her mother, Gladys, was a social worker. Her parents were proud but not observant Jews, but when Eilberg was fourteen, her newfound commitment to traditional Jewish observance led her mother to make their home kitchen conform to the Jewish dietary laws  kashrut. In high school, she was involved in the United Synagogue Youth and she later worked at Camp Ramah in the Poconos, in New England, and in Wisconsin.

Eilberg attended Brandeis University from 1972 to 1976, continuing to develop her deep interest in Judaism. She majored in Near Eastern and Judaic Studies, and also became an active member of Hillel International on campus. While at Brandeis she learned how to read the Torah and began to pray with tallit and tephillin. In 1976 she graduated from Brandeis and enrolled in Jewish Theological Seminary (JTS) to do graduate work in Talmud. After receiving her master's degree, she taught at Midreshet Yerushalayim, an intensive egalitarian yeshiva program run by the JTS in Israel. When she found out that JTS had tabled the question of women's ordination in 1979, she was disappointed but she began to pursue doctoral studies in Talmud, first at Neve Schechter, the JTS branch in Jerusalem, and then at JTS in New York City. She later enrolled in the Smith College School for Social Work and in 1984 received her masters of social work.

Rabbinical school
Eilberg was among the first group of women who immediately signed up for classes in the rabbinical school in the fall of 1984. Since the early 1970s, leaders of the Jewish Theological Seminary (JTS) had engaged in serious discussions and debates about women's ordination in Conservative Judaism. Hastened by the Reform movement's decision to ordain Sally Priesand in 1972 and the Reconstructionist movement to ordain Sandy Eisenberg Sasso in 1974, members of the Rabbinical Assembly, the central organization of Conservative rabbis, initiated exploratory studies about Jewish legal attitudes toward women's ordination. As of 2014, the seminaries of the Conservative Movement have ordained approximately 300 women rabbis.

Rabbinic life
On May 12, 1985, at the age of thirty, Eilberg became the first woman ordained in Conservative Judaism. In 1986 she became the first woman appointed to serve on the Rabbinical Assembly's Committee on Jewish Law and Standards. She started her career as a chaplain at Methodist Hospital in Indianapolis. She served for one year as  the assistant rabbi at Har Zion Temple near Philadelphia. In 1989, she stepped down from that position at this synagogue, explaining in her resignation letter that her desire to spend more time with her young daughter was one of the primary motivations for her decision. She also realized that her true passion was for caring for the ill. She served as hospice chaplain for the Jewish Hospice Program in Philadelphia, then she helped found the Bay Area Jewish Healing Center in San Francisco where she directed the program's Jewish Hospice Care Program. At the height of the AIDS crisis, the Jewish Healing Center offered spiritual care to Jews people living with illness, death, and loss.

Eilberg appeared in a 2005 documentary, titled And the Gates Opened: Women in the Rabbinate, which features stories of and interviews with her, rabbi Sally Priesand, and rabbi Sandy Eisenberg Sasso.

On December 6, 2010, at Temple Reyim in Newton, MA, Amy Eilberg met for the first time with Sally Priesand, the first Reform female rabbi, Sandy Eisenberg Sasso, the first Reconstructionist female rabbi, and Sara Hurwitz, considered by some to be the first Orthodox female rabbi. They and approximately 30 other women rabbis lit Chanukah candles and then spoke about their experiences in an open forum.

On June 3, 2012, Priesand, Sasso, Eilberg, and Hurwitz met again, this time at Monmouth Reform Temple at a celebration honoring the four first women rabbis to be ordained in their respective denominations, and the 40th anniversary of Priesand's ordination.

The art exhibit “Holy Sparks”, which opened in February 2022 at the Heller Museum and the Skirball Museum, featured 24 Jewish women artists, who had each created an artwork about a female rabbi who was a first in some way. Pat Berger created the artwork about Eilberg.

Personal life
Eilberg has been married twice, first to Howard Eilberg-Schwartz, and then, in 1996, to Louis E. Newman, a professor of Judaic Studies at Carleton College. She has one daughter, Penina, from her first marriage, and two stepsons, Etan and Jonah, from her second. She lived in Mendota Heights, Minnesota, and was a regular member of Beth Jacob Congregation in Mendota Heights. She currently lives in San Francisco.

Writings

See also
Timeline of women rabbis

Notes

References

External links
 JTS Faculty Senate Votes to Admit Women October 24, 1983
 Amy Eilberg ordained as first female Conservative rabbi
 Jewish Women and the Feminist Revolution from the Jewish Women's Archive
 Minnesota Voices Rabbi Amy Eilberg  March 18, 2009
 Amy Eilberg, An Ordination First, and What Followed in Jewish Daily Forward, May 14, 2010

Videos
 at the 2010 Guardian of Democracy Dinner, October 16, 2010.

1954 births
Living people
20th-century American rabbis
21st-century American rabbis
American Conservative rabbis
Brandeis University alumni
Conservative women rabbis
People from Mendota Heights, Minnesota
1985 in Judaism
American social workers
Smith College School for Social Work alumni